Triple M Gippsland (official callsign: 3SEA) is a commercial radio station owned and operated by Southern Cross Austereo as part of the Triple M network. The station is broadcast to townships in the Gippsland region of Victoria from studios in Warragul.

The station commenced broadcasting in 2002 as 94.3 Sea FM as a supplementary license to 3GG. On 4 July 2005, the station relaunched as Star FM in line with Macquarie Regional RadioWorks' other Victorian stations, retaining its contemporary hit radio music format. On 15 December 2016, the station was again relaunched as Hit Gippsland.

On 20 July 2020, the station flipped formats to mainstream rock as Triple M. Networked programming, including Carrie & Tommy and Hughesy & Kate were replaced by that of the Triple M network. Despite being part of the Hit Network, the station had previously broadcast Triple M AFL coverage as the only Southern Cross Austereo-owned station in the Gippsland region.

Programming
Local programming is produced and broadcast from the station's Warragul studios from 6am–9am weekdays. The station's local output consists of a three-hour breakfast show presented by Ed Cowlishaw.

Networked programming originates from studios in Albury, and Melbourne.

 Shows
 6am-9am - Ed for Breakfast
 9am-12pm - Guy Mylecharane
 12pm-3pm - Leisha Brodyk
 3pm-4pm - The Marty Sheargold Show
 4pm-6pm - The Rush Hour with JB and Bill

Transmission Quality
The station transmits from a main transmitter and a repeater:
 94.3 FM is broadcast from the main transmitter which is a site near Yarragon South (coords) at 7 kW Power. 
 97.9 FM is broadcast from the repeater which is a site near Tyers (coords) at a power of 500W.

References

External links
 

Mainstream rock radio stations in Australia
Radio stations established in 2002
Radio stations in Victoria
2002 establishments in Australia